Aces Game Studio (ACES) was an American video game developer based in Redmond, Washington, owned by Microsoft Game Studios. It was founded in 1988 under the name Bruce Artwick Organization Limited (BAO Ltd.) at Champaign, Illinois, by Bruce Artwick, creator of Microsoft Flight Simulator, Microsoft Space Simulator and also co-founder of Sublogic.

Following the purchase of BAO Ltd. in December 1995, Microsoft renamed the studio to Microsoft Simulation Group, moving employees from Champaign, Illinois, to the company's headquarters in Redmond, Washington, where it became part of its Games Group division, which at the time was also co-owner of DreamWorks Interactive. The studio continued to develop its simulation games, acting as the developer of the Microsoft Flight Simulator and Microsoft Combat Flight Simulator series. The group had also assisted Kuju Entertainment in developing Microsoft Train Simulator. With the launch of the first Xbox console, the group was moved to Microsoft Games (later renamed Microsoft Game Studios) in 2000 and renamed to Aces Game Studio in 2002. They worked with Stormfront Studios to develop Blood Wake as a launch title for the Xbox in 2001. 

In the following years, Aces led development on the next three iterations of Microsoft Flight Simulator, including Microsoft Flight Simulator 2004: A Century of Flight (2004) and Microsoft Flight Simulator X (2006).

As part of a move that cut 5,000 jobs at Microsoft, Aces Game Studio was closed on January 22, 2009.

In October 2009, Rick Selby and Kathie Flood, alongside other former members of Aces Game Studio, launched a new studio, Cascade Game Foundry, for the development of simulation games.

Notable alumni of Aces include Rod Fergusson, who after Aces worked at both Epic Games and The Coalition as one of the lead designers in the Gears of War series.

References 

Microsoft Flight Simulator
Former Microsoft subsidiaries
Video game development companies
Video game companies disestablished in 2009
Defunct video game companies of the United States
Defunct companies based in Redmond, Washington
Defunct companies based in Washington (state)
2009 disestablishments in Washington (state)